Metadiaptomus purcelli is a species of crustacean in the family Diaptomidae. It is endemic to South Africa.

References

Diaptomidae
Endemic crustaceans of South Africa
Freshwater crustaceans of Africa
Crustaceans described in 1907
Taxonomy articles created by Polbot